Clarence Eugene "Jack" Wallace (August 6, 1890 – October 15, 1960) was a Major League Baseball catcher. Wallace played for the Chicago Cubs in the 1915 season. He played just two games in his career, having two hits in seven at-bats. Wallace was born and died in Winnfield, Louisiana.

External links

1890 births
1960 deaths
Chicago Cubs players
Major League Baseball catchers
Baseball players from Louisiana
Birmingham Barons players
Memphis Chickasaws players